The 1997 Food City 500 was the seventh stock car race of the 1997 NASCAR Winston Cup Series and the 37th iteration of the event. The race was held on Sunday, April 13, 1997, in Bristol, Tennessee at Bristol Motor Speedway, a 0.533 miles (0.858 km) permanent oval-shaped racetrack. The race took the scheduled 500 laps to complete. On the final lap of the race, Hendrick Motorsports driver Jeff Gordon would manage to complete a bump-and-run on Penske Racing South driver Rusty Wallace in the final two turns to take his 22nd career NASCAR Winston Cup Series victory and his third victory of the season. To fill out the top three, Wallace and Hendrick Motorsports driver Terry Labonte would finish second and third, respectively.

Background 

The Bristol Motor Speedway, formerly known as Bristol International Raceway and Bristol Raceway, is a NASCAR short track venue located in Bristol, Tennessee. Constructed in 1960, it held its first NASCAR race on July 30, 1961. Despite its short length, Bristol is among the most popular tracks on the NASCAR schedule because of its distinct features, which include extraordinarily steep banking, an all concrete surface, two pit roads, and stadium-like seating. It has also been named one of the loudest NASCAR tracks.

Entry list 

 (R) denotes rookie driver.

Qualifying 
Qualifying was split into two rounds. The first round was held on Friday, March 21, at 3:00 PM EST. Each driver would have one lap to set a time. During the first round, the top 25 drivers in the round would be guaranteed a starting spot in the race. If a driver was not able to guarantee a spot in the first round, they had the option to scrub their time from the first round and try and run a faster lap time in a second round qualifying run, held on Saturday, March 22, at 12:30 PM EST. As with the first round, each driver would have one lap to set a time. Positions 26-38 would be decided on time, while positions 39-43 would be based on provisionals. Four spots are awarded by the use of provisionals based on owner's points. The fifth is awarded to a past champion who has not otherwise qualified for the race. If no past champion needs the provisional, the next team in the owner points will be awarded a provisional.

Four drivers would fail to qualify: Bobby Hillin Jr., Billy Standridge, Mike Wallace, and Greg Sacks.

Full qualifying results

Race results

References 

1997 NASCAR Winston Cup Series
NASCAR races at Bristol Motor Speedway
April 1997 sports events in the United States
1997 in sports in Tennessee